The Amarnath Express is an Superfast Express train belonging to North Eastern Railway zone that runs between  and  in India. It is currently being operated with 12587/12588 train numbers on a weekly basis.

Service

The 12587/Amarnath Express has an average speed of 56 km/hr and covers 1247 km in 22h 15m. The 12588/Amarnath Express Express has an average speed of 58 km/hr and covers 1247 km in 21h 40m.

Route and halts 

The important halts of the train are:

Coach composition

The train has standard ICF rakes with a max speed of 110 kmph. The train consists of 24 coaches:

 1 AC III Tier
 3 AC III Tier
 13 Sleeper coaches
 1 Pantry car
 4 General Unreserved
 2 Seating cum Luggage Rake

Traction

Both trains are hauled by a WAP7 Ghaziabad electric locomotive from Gorakhpur to Jammu and vice versa.

Rake sharing

The train shares its rake with 15097/15098 Bhagalpur–Jammu Tawi Amarnath Express.

See also 

 Gorakhpur Junction railway station
 Jammu Tawi railway station
 Amarnath Express
 Bhagalpur–Jammu Tawi Amarnath Express

Notes

References

External links 

 12587/Amarnath Superfast Express India Rail Info
 12588/Amarnath Superfast Express India Rail Info

Transport in Jammu
Express trains in India
Passenger trains originating from Gorakhpur
Rail transport in Uttarakhand
Rail transport in Haryana
Rail transport in Punjab, India
Rail transport in Jammu and Kashmir